Adrian Sorichetti (born October 8, 1990 in Whitby, Ontario) is a Canadian professional lacrosse player who plays for the San Diego Seals of the National Lacrosse League. Adrian was drafted in the second round (13th overall) in the 2013 NLL Entry Draft by the Edmonton Rush. Adrian attended high school at All Saints Catholic Secondary School in Whitby for two years before receiving a hockey and lacrosse scholarship to Trinity Pawling Preparatory School in Pawling, NY. Adrian grew up playing hockey and lacrosse in Whitby, Ontario.

College career

Hofstra University
2010: CAA All-Rookie Team selection

2012: All-CAA first team selection...Played in 12 games and started 11...Led the team in assists with 14 and points with 38...Ranked sixth in the CAA and 39th in Division I in points per game (3.17)...Tallied 24 goals on the year which ranked second on the team, fifth in the CAA and 41st in Division I in goals average (2.0)...Seven multi-goal games...Recorded career-highs of seven goals, three assists and 10 points against St. John's...It was the most goals by a Pride player since 2003 and the most points since 1989

2013 Preseason All-America second team selection by Inside Lacrosse Face-Off Yearbook...Named to Preseason All-CAA team in the Inside Lacrosse Face-Off Yearbook Coaches Poll...2013 Preseason All-CAA Team selection...

NLL
Reference:

References

1990 births
Living people
Canadian lacrosse players
Edmonton Rush players
Lacrosse people from Ontario
Saskatchewan Rush players
Sportspeople from Whitby, Ontario